Tatanka is a 2011 Italian drama film written, directed, and starring Giuseppe Gagliardi. It is based on the short story "Tatanka scatenato" by Roberto Saviano.

The film marked the acting debut of the boxer Clemente Russo; after his participation in the film Russo, who is a member of the Gruppo Sportivo Fiamme Oro, was suspended for a period of six months from the Polizia di Stato. According to some sources, Russo was punished because of some explicit scenes that could have damaged the image of the police, but these circumstances were denied by the State Police which claimed that the suspension derived from the lack of authorizations and permissions to participate in the film.

The film was nominated to three Nastro d'Argento Awards, for Best Supporting Actor (Giorgio Colangeli), Best Cinematography and Best Sound.

Cast and characters
 Clemente Russo as Michele
 Rade Šerbedžija as  Vinko
 Carmine Recano as Rosario
 Giorgio Colangeli as  Sabatino
 Suzanne Wolff as  Petra
 Sascha Zacharias as  Caroline
 Raiz as  Salvatore Vitiello

See also  
 List of Italian films of 2011

References

External links
 

2011 films
Italian sports drama films
2010s sports drama films
Italian boxing films
Films set in Campania
Biographical films about sportspeople
Cultural depictions of Italian men
Cultural depictions of boxers
Films based on Italian novels
Films about the Camorra
2011 drama films
2010s Italian films